Flat Creek is a stream in St. Louis County in the U.S. state of Missouri. It is a tributary of the Meramec River.

Flat Creek was so named on account of the flat terrain along its course.

See also
List of rivers of Missouri

References

Rivers of St. Louis County, Missouri
Rivers of Missouri